Mochiaki (written: 茂韶 or 茂昭) is a masculine Japanese given name. Notable people with the name include:

 (1846–1918), Japanese daimyō and diplomat
 (1836–1890), Japanese daimyō

Japanese masculine given names